Christopher Leslie Barnard (born 1 August 1947) was a Welsh professional footballer in the 1960s and 1970s. He was born in Cardiff.

Career

Chris Barnard, a midfielder, began his career as an apprentice at Southend United, turning professional in August 1965 and playing 8 times in the league the following season (4 as substitute). In July 1966 he moved to Ipswich Town on a free transfer, but failed to win a regular place at Portman Road, appearing only 21 times in the league in 4 years. In October 1970, Torquay United paid £8,000 for his services, some of which was repaid in January 1971 when he scored twice as the Gulls came from 3-0 down to beat Lincoln City 4–3 in the FA Cup. In January 1972, after 32 league games (3 goals) for the Gulls, he moved to Charlton Athletic on a free transfer, but made only one substitute appearance before leaving. He finished his career with non-league side Chelmsford City

External links 

Pride of Anglia profile

1947 births
Living people
Welsh footballers
Southend United F.C. players
Ipswich Town F.C. players
Torquay United F.C. players
Charlton Athletic F.C. players
English Football League players
Chelmsford City F.C. players
Association football midfielders
Footballers from Cardiff